Erythromma najas, the red-eyed damselfly, is a member of the Coenagrionidae family of damselflies.

Appearance
The male resembles blue-tailed damselflies (Ischnura species) but is distinguished by its large, spaced eyes that are a deep red. It is very similar to the small red-eyed damselfly (Erythromma viridulum).

Behaviour

Males typically spend much of their time perched on the leaves of floating vegetation such as water lilies or mats of algae.

References

External links

Coenagrionidae
Damselflies of Europe
Insects described in 1823
Taxa named by Johann Wilhelm Adolf Hansemann